The Dundee, Broughty Ferry and District Tramways operated a tramway service between Dundee and Broughty Ferry between 1905 and 1931.

History

The Dundee, Broughty Ferry and District Tramways Order Confirmation Act of 1904 have the company the authority to construct the tramway, and the company was registered in 1905.

Services started on 27 December 1905. The depot and power station was built on Ferry Road. Coal for the power station was delivered by railway. The power station comprised 3 Lancashire boilers and 2 Bellis-Bruce Peebles 200 kW generators.

There were 12 tramcars obtained for the initial services in 1905. 2 more were bought in 1907 and 2 were obtained secondhand from Dundee Corporation in 1914 The head office was at 4 High Street, Dundee. The line ran as far as the junction of High Street and Tay Street in Monifieth.

Closure

In  1931 the company was purchased by the Dundee corporation and closed on 15 May 1931. One mile of its former route continued to be operated by Dundee Corporation Tramways.

References

Tram transport in Scotland
History of Dundee
Transport in Dundee